Jordi Casamitjana is a vegan zoologist, animal protection campaigner, and animal rights activist. He was born in Catalonia in 1964 but is a British citizen living in the UK since 1993. He identifies as an ethical vegan. In April 2018, he was fired from the League Against Cruel Sports (LACS) after he disclosed to his colleagues that it was investing in firms related to animal testing. Casamitjana claimed that LACS's decision to fire him was based on his ethical vegan belief. LACS said it was because of gross misconduct. He took legal action against LACS, which ended in an out-of-court settlement in his favour. The landmark case confirmed that ethical veganism is protected under the Equality Act of 2010 in the UK as a philosophical belief. This was the first time the specific belief of ethical veganism had been legally recognised and protected in any jurisdiction in the world. He is also the author of the book "Ethical Vegan: a Personal and Political Journey to Change the World".

Casamitjana has worked as a freelance animal welfare consultant, undercover investigator and writer, and as an employee of campaign departments of several animal protection organisations, including the Monkey Sanctuary (Wild Futures), the Born Free Foundation, the League Against Cruel Sports, CAS International, the International Fund for Animal Welfare (IFAW), and People for the Ethical Treatment of Animals (PETA) UK.

References 

Activists from Catalonia
Living people
British animal rights activists
British veganism activists
Year of birth missing (living people)